Empson Othman Desai Williams (June 12, 1959 – April 10, 2022) was a Canadian sprinter, who won an Olympic bronze medal in 4 x 100 metres relay in Los Angeles 1984. He was born in Basseterre, St. Kitts and Nevis.

Competing at the first two World Championships, where he reached the semi-final (1983 and 1987), he set his personal best 200 metres time with 20.29 s in 1983 and his 100 metres personal best time of 10.11 s from a 6th-place finish at the 1988 Olympic Games in Seoul, South Korea.

Williams trained with the Scarborough Optimists Track Club, which was affiliated with the Ben Johnson scandal. Club coach Charlie Francis, working with Dr. Jamie Astaphan, had supplied performance-enhancing drugs to Johnson, Williams, Tony Sharpe, Angella Taylor, Mark McKoy, and others.

Williams also worked as the speed coach for the Toronto Argonauts, training Olympic athletes Tremaine Harris, Phylicia George. and Justyn Warner, among others.

Williams was fired as a coach by Athletics Canada in 2015. A probe found that Williams had violated the organization's sexual harassment policy while a coach in 2010. In 2018, he was handed a lifetime ban by Athletics Canada.

Williams died of a heart attack on April 10, 2022 at the age of 62.

International competitions

See also
List of doping cases in athletics

References

Further reading 
 

1959 births
2022 deaths
Canadian male sprinters
Olympic track and field athletes of Canada
Olympic bronze medalists for Canada
Medalists at the 1984 Summer Olympics
Athletes (track and field) at the 1984 Summer Olympics
Athletes (track and field) at the 1988 Summer Olympics
Pan American Games track and field athletes for Canada
Athletes (track and field) at the 1979 Pan American Games
Athletes (track and field) at the 1983 Pan American Games
Commonwealth Games gold medallists for Canada
Commonwealth Games silver medallists for Canada
Commonwealth Games medallists in athletics
Athletes (track and field) at the 1978 Commonwealth Games
Athletes (track and field) at the 1982 Commonwealth Games
Athletes (track and field) at the 1986 Commonwealth Games
World Athletics Championships athletes for Canada
Ben Johnson doping case
Canadian sportspeople in doping cases
Doping cases in athletics
Clemson Tigers men's track and field athletes
Black Canadian track and field athletes
Saint Kitts and Nevis emigrants to Canada
People from Basseterre
Olympic bronze medalists in athletics (track and field)
Universiade medalists in athletics (track and field)
Universiade silver medalists for Canada
Medalists at the 1983 Summer Universiade
Medallists at the 1982 Commonwealth Games
Medallists at the 1986 Commonwealth Games